Runar Sjåstad (born 28 August 1968) is a Norwegian politician for the Labour Party.

In the 2001, 2009 and 2013 elections he was elected as a deputy representative to the Parliament of Norway from Finnmark. He hails from Vadsø. In the 2007 elections he was elected as the county mayor of Finnmark, and he was re-elected in 2011 and 2015.

He was elected as a representative to the Parliament of Norway in 2017.

References

1968 births
Living people
People from Vadsø
Labour Party (Norway) politicians
Finnmark politicians
Members of the Storting
Chairmen of County Councils of Norway